Rio das Pedras is a region of Rio de Janeiro, but not officially recognized as a neighborhood. The favela sits in Rio de Janeiro’s West Zone by the neighborhood of Itanhangá.  Rio das Pedras’ borders are defined by the Tijuca National Park, the Tijuca Lagoon, and private land designated for the expansion of Barra da Tijuca.

Geography of Rio de Janeiro (city)